Gloria May Josephine Swanson (March 27, 1899April 4, 1983) was an American actress and producer. She first achieved fame acting in dozens of silent films in the 1920s and was nominated three times for the Academy Award for Best Actress, most famously for her 1950 return in Billy Wilder's Sunset Boulevard, which also earned her a Golden Globe Award.

Swanson was born in Chicago and raised in a military family that moved from base to base. Her infatuation with Essanay Studios actor Francis X. Bushman led to her aunt taking her to tour the actor's Chicago studio. The 15-year-old Swanson was offered a brief walk-on for one film, beginning her life's career in front of the cameras.  Swanson was soon hired to work in California for Mack Sennett's Keystone Studios comedy shorts opposite Bobby Vernon. 

She was eventually recruited by Famous Players-Lasky/Paramount Pictures, where she was put under contract for seven years and became a global superstar. She starred in a series of films about society, directed by Cecil B. DeMille, including Male and Female (1919). She continued as a successful movie star in The Affairs of Anatol (1921) and Beyond the Rocks (1922). She also starred in critically acclaimed performances such as Zaza (1923) and Madame Sans-Gêne (1925).

In 1925, Swanson joined United Artists as one of the film industry's pioneering women filmmakers. She produced and starred in the 1928 film Sadie Thompson, earning her a nomination for Best Actress at the first annual Academy Awards. Her sound film debut performance in 1929's The Trespasser, earned her a second Academy Award nomination. Queen Kelly (1928–29) was a box office disaster, but is remembered as a silent classic. After almost two decades in front of the cameras, her film success waned during the 1930s. Swanson received renewed praise for her return to the screen in her role as Norma Desmond in Sunset Boulevard (1950). She only made three more films, but guest starred on several television shows, and acted in road productions of stage plays.

Early life 
Swanson was born in a small house in Chicago in 1899, the only child of Adelaide (née Klanowski) and Joseph Theodore Swanson (né Svensson), a soldier. She was raised in the Lutheran faith. Her father was a Swedish American and her mother was of German, French, and Polish ancestry. Because of her father's attachment to the U.S. Army, the family moved frequently. She spent some of her childhood in Key West, Florida, where she was enrolled in a Catholic convent school, and in Puerto Rico, where she saw her first motion pictures.

Career

1914–1918:  Essanay/Keystone/Triangle

Her family once again residing in Chicago, the adolescent Gloria developed a crush on actor Francis X. Bushman and knew he was employed by Essanay Studios in the city. Swanson would later recall that her Aunt Inga brought her at age 15 to visit Bushman's studio, where she was discovered by a tour guide. Other accounts have the star-struck Swanson herself talking her way into the business. In either version, she was soon hired as an extra.

The movie industry was still in its infancy, churning out short subjects, without the advantage of today's casting agencies and talent agents promoting their latest find.  A willing extra was often a valuable asset.  Her first role was a brief walk-on with actress Gerda Holmes, that paid an enormous (in those days) $3.25. The studio soon offered her steady work at $13.25 per week. Swanson left school to work full-time at the studio. In 1915, she co-starred in Sweedie Goes to College with her future first husband Wallace Beery.

Swanson's mother accompanied her to California in 1916 for her roles in Mack Sennett's Keystone Studios comedy shorts opposite Bobby Vernon and directed by Clarence G. Badger. They were met at the train station by Beery, who was pursuing his own career ambitions at Keystone. Vernon and Swanson projected a great screen chemistry that proved popular with audiences.  Director Charley Chase recalled that Swanson was "frightened to death" of Vernon's dangerous stunts. Surviving movies in which they appear together include The Danger Girl (1916), The Sultan's Wife (1917), and Teddy at the Throttle (1917). Badger was sufficiently impressed by Swanson to recommend her to the director Jack Conway for Her Decision and You Can't Believe Everything in 1918. Triangle had never put Swanson under contract, but did increase her pay to $15 a week. When she was approached by Famous Players-Lasky to work for Cecil B. DeMille, the resulting legal dispute obligated her to Triangle for several more months. Soon afterwards, Triangle was in a financial bind and loaned Swanson to DeMille for the comedy Don't Change Your Husband.

1919–1926: Famous Players-Lasky/Paramount Pictures

At the behest of DeMille, Swanson signed a contract with Famous Players-Lasky on December 30, 1918, for $150 a week, to be raised to $200 a week, and eventually $350 a week. Her first picture under her new contract was DeMille's World War I romantic drama For Better, for Worse.  She made six pictures under the direction of DeMille, including Male and Female (1919) in which she posed with a lion as "Lion's Bride". While she and her father were dining out one evening, the man who would become her second husband, Equity Pictures president Herbert K. Somborn, introduced himself, by inviting her to meet one of her personal idols, actress Clara Kimball Young.

Why Change Your Wife? (1920), Something to Think About (1920), and The Affairs of Anatol (1921) soon followed. She next appeared in 10 films directed by Sam Wood, starting with The Great Moment (1921) and including Beyond the Rocks in 1922 with her longtime friend Rudolph Valentino. Valentino had become a star in 1921 for his appearance in The Four Horsemen of the Apocalypse, but Swanson had known him since his days as an aspiring actor getting small parts, with no seeming hope for his professional future. She was impressed by his shy, well-mannered personality, the complete opposite of what his public image would become.

After her films with Wood, she appeared in Zaza (1923) directed by Allan Dwan. During her time at Famous Players-Lasky, seven more of her films were directed by Dwan. 

In 1925, Swanson starred in the French-American comedy Madame Sans-Gêne, directed by Léonce Perret. Filming was allowed for the first time at many of the historic sites relating to Napoleon. While it was well received at the time, no prints are known to exist and it is considered to be a lost film. Swanson appeared in a 1925 short produced by Lee de Forest in his Phonofilm sound-on-film process. She made a number of films for Paramount, including The Coast of Folly (1925), Stage Struck (1925) and The Untamed Lady (1926). Before she could produce films with United Artists, she completed Fine Manners with Paramount and turned down an offer to make The King of Kings with DeMille.

1925–1933: United Artists

She turned down a one-million-dollar-a-year contract with Paramount to join the newly created United Artists partnership on June 25, 1925, accepting a six-picture distribution offer from president Joseph Schenck. At the time, Swanson was considered the most bankable star of her era. United Artists had its own Art Cinema Corporation subsidiary to advance financial loans for the productions of individual partners. The partnership agreement included her commitment to a buy-in of $100,000 of preferred stock subscription.

Swanson Producing Corporation

The Swanson Producing Corporation was set up as the umbrella organization for her agreement with United Artists.  Under that name, she produced The Love of Sunya with herself in the title role. The film co-starring John Boles was directed by Albert Parker, based on the play The Eyes of Youth, by Max Marcin and Charles Guernon. The production was a disaster, with Parker being indecisive and the actors not experienced enough to deliver the performances she wanted.  The film fell behind in its schedule, and by the time of its release, the end product had not lived up to Swanson's expectations. While it did not lose money, it was a financial wash, breaking even on the production costs.

Gloria Swanson Productions

She engaged the services of director Raoul Walsh in 1927 and together they conceived of making a film based on W. Somerset Maugham's short story "Miss Thompson". Gloria Swanson Productions proposed to film the controversial Sadie Thompson about the travails of a prostitute living in American Samoa, a project that initially pleased United Artists president Joseph Schenck.   As she moved forward with the project, association members urged Schenck to halt the production due to its subject matter. The members took further steps by registering their discontent with Will H. Hays, Chairman of the Motion Picture Producers and Distributors of America. Walsh previously had his own battles with the Hays office, having managed to skirt around censorship issues with What Price Glory?  By bringing him to the table, literally over breakfast in her home, Hays and Swanson developed a working relationship for the film. Hays was enthusiastic about the basic story, but did have specific issues that were dealt with before the film's release. The project was filmed on Santa Catalina Island, just off the coast of Long Beach, California.  Gross receipts slightly exceeded $850,000. At the first annual Academy Awards, Swanson received a nomination for Best Actress for her performance, and the film's cinematographer George Barnes was also nominated.

Gloria Productions 

By the end of 1927, Swanson was in dire financial straits, with only $65 in the bank. Her two productions had generated income, but too slowly to offset her production loan debts to Art Cinema Corporation.  Swanson had also not made good on her $100,000 subscription for preferred United Artists shared stock. She had received financial proposals from United Artists studio head Joseph Schenck, as well as from Bank of America, prior to engaging the services of Joseph P. Kennedy Sr. as her financial advisor. He proposed to personally bankroll her next picture and conducted a thorough examination of her financial records. Kennedy advised her to shut down Swanson Producing Corporation. She agreed to his plan for a fresh start under the dummy corporate name of Gloria Productions, headquartered in Delaware. Upon his advice, she fired most of her staff and sold her rights for The Love of Sunya and Sadie Thompson to Art Cinema Corporation. Kennedy then created the position of  "European director of Pathé" to put her third husband Henry de La Falaise on the payroll.

Sound films were already becoming popular with audiences, most notably the films of singer Al Jolson, who had success with The Jazz Singer released in 1927 and The Singing Fool in 1928. Kennedy, however, advised her to hire Erich von Stroheim to direct another silent film, The Swamp, subsequently retitled Queen Kelly. She was hesitant to hire Stroheim, who was known for being difficult to deal with and who was unwilling to work within any budget.  Kennedy, nevertheless, was insistent and was able to get Stroheim released from contractual obligations to producer Pat Powers. Stroheim worked for several months on writing the basic script.  Filming of Queen Kelly began in November. His filming was slow, albeit meticulous, and the cast and crew suffered from long hours. Shooting was shut down in January, and Stroheim fired, after complaints by Swanson about him and about the general direction the film was taking. Swanson and Kennedy tried to salvage it with an alternative ending shot on November 24, 1931, directed by Swanson and photographed by Gregg Toland.

Only two other films were made under Gloria Productions. The Trespasser in 1929 was a sound production, and garnered Swanson her second Oscar nomination. Written by Edmund Goulding, with Laura Hope Crews fine-tuning the dialogue, Kennedy approved funding for the go-ahead on the production. The film was a melodrama, complete with musical numbers sung by Swanson and completed in 21 days. The world premiere was held in London, the first American sound production to do so. Swanson was mobbed by adoring fans. Before leaving London, she sang at a concert carried over the BBC. What a Widow! in 1930 was the final film for Gloria Productions.

United Artists stars on the radio
Mary Pickford and her husband Douglas Fairbanks hosted the March 29, 1928, episode of the Dodge Hour radio program, originating from Pickford's private bungalow at United Artists, and broadcast to audiences in American movie theaters. The brainchild of Joseph Schenck, it was a promotional come-on to attract audiences into movie theaters to hear the voices of their favorite actors, as sound productions became the future of commercial films. On hand were Swanson, Charlie Chaplin, Norma Talmadge, John Barrymore, Dolores del Río and D. W. Griffith.

Gloria Swanson British Productions Ltd.

Before she began filming Perfect Understanding as Gloria Swanson British Productions Ltd., she finished a two-film package production for Art Cinema, which included Indiscreet and  Tonight or Never (1931). Perfect Understanding, a 1933 sound production comedy, was the only film produced by this company. Made entirely at Ealing Studios, it co-starred Laurence Olivier as Swanson's on-screen husband.  United Artists bought back all of her stock with them, in order to provide her financing to make this film, and thereby ending her relationship with the partnership. The film was panned by the critics upon its release and failed at the box office.

1938–1950: Creating new paths
When she made the transition to sound films as her career simultaneously began to decline, Swanson moved permanently to New York City in 1938. Swanson starred in Father Takes a Wife for RKO in 1941. She began appearing in stage productions and starred in The Gloria Swanson Hour on WPIX-TV in 1948. Swanson threw herself into painting and sculpting and, in 1954, published Gloria Swanson’s Diary, a general newsletter. She toured in summer stock, engaged in political activism, designed and marketed clothing and accessories, and made personal appearances on radio and in movie theaters.

1950 – 1977: Later career

Sunset Boulevard

The film Sunset Boulevard was conceived by director Billy Wilder and screenwriter Charles Brackett, and came to include writer D. M. Marshman Jr. They bandied about the name of Mae West, whose public persona even in her senior years was as a sex symbol, but she objected to playing a has-been. Mary Pickford was also considered  for the lead role of Norma Desmond. It was director George Cukor who suggested Swanson, noting that she was once such a valuable asset to her studio that she was, "...carried in a sedan chair from her dressing room to the set".

The storyline of the film follows a faded silent movie actress Norma Desmond (Swanson), in love with a failed screenwriter Joe Gillis (William Holden). She lives at the mansion with her former-director-turned-butler Max von Mayerling (Erich von Stroheim), who personally disliked the role and only agreed to it out of financial need. A clip from Queen Kelly was used for the scene where Joe and Norma are watching one of her silent films, and she declares, "... we didn't need dialogue, we had faces". Norma plays a card game of bridge with a group of actors also known as "the Waxworks". They included Buster Keaton, H.B. Warner and Anna Q. Nilsson. During the scene leading up to Cecil B. DeMille's cameo, where Max chauffeurs Joe and Norma to the studio, her Isotta Fraschini luxury automobile was towed from behind the camera, because Stroheim had never learned how to drive. Norma's dreams of a comeback are subverted, and when Gillis tries to break up with her, she threatens to kill herself, but instead kills him. She becomes delusional by the time the police and news media arrive. Max sets up the studio lighting towards her on the staircase and directs her down towards the waiting police and news cameras, where she says, "All right, Mr. DeMille, I'm ready for my close-up."

Although Swanson had objected to enduring a screen test for the film, she had been glad to be making much more money than she had been in television and on stage. She found the overall experience of making the movie a pleasure, and later stated, "I hated to have the picture end ... When Mr. Wilder called ‘Print it!’ I burst into tears...” She was nominated for a Best Actress Academy Award, but lost to Judy Holliday.

Final films
Swanson received several acting offers following the release of Sunset Boulevard, but turned most of them down, saying they tended to be pale imitations of Norma Desmond. Her last major Hollywood motion picture role was also her first color film, the poorly received 3 for Bedroom C in 1952. 
Nationally syndicated columnist Suzy called it "one of the worst movies ever made."  In 1956, Swanson made Nero's Mistress, an Italian film shot in Rome, which starred Alberto Sordi, Vittorio de Sica and Brigitte Bardot. Her final screen appearance was as herself in Airport 1975.

Television and theatre 

Swanson hosted The Gloria Swanson Hour, one of the first live television series in 1948 in which she invited friends and others to be guests. Swanson later hosted Crown Theatre with Gloria Swanson, a television anthology series in which she occasionally acted.

Through the 1960s, 1970s, and early 1980s, Swanson appeared on many different talk and variety shows such as The Carol Burnett Show and The Tonight Show Starring Johnny Carson to recollect her movies and to lampoon them as well. On The Carol Burnett Show in 1973, Swanson reprised her impersonation of Charlie Chaplin from both Sunset Boulevard and Manhandled. She was the "mystery guest" on What's My Line. She acted in "Behind the Locked Door" on The Alfred Hitchcock Hour in 1964 and, in the same year, she was nominated for a Golden Globe award for her performance in Burke's Law. She made a guest appearance on The Dick Cavett Show in the summer of 1970; a guest on the same show as Janis Joplin. She made a notable appearance in a 1966 episode of The Beverly Hillbillies, in which she plays herself.  In the episode, the Clampetts mistakenly believe Swanson is destitute and decide to finance a comeback movie for her – in a silent film.

After near-retirement from movies, Swanson appeared in many plays throughout her later life, beginning in the 1940s. Actor and playwright Harold J. Kennedy, who had learned the ropes at Yale and with Orson Welles' Mercury Theatre, suggested Swanson do a road tour of "Reflected Glory", a comedy that had run on the Broadway stage with Tallulah Bankhead as its star. Kennedy wrote the script for the play A Goose for the Gander, which began its road tour in Chicago in August 1944.

Swanson also toured with Let Us Be Gay. After her success with Sunset Boulevard, she starred on Broadway in a revival of Twentieth Century with José Ferrer, and in Nina with David Niven. Her last major stage role was in the 1971 Broadway production of Butterflies Are Free at the Booth Theatre. Kevin Brownlow and David Gill interviewed her for Hollywood, a television history of the silent era.

Personal life 

Swanson was a vegetarian and an early health food advocate who was known for bringing her own meals to public functions in a tin box. In 1975, Swanson traveled the United States and helped to promote the book Sugar Blues written by her husband, William Dufty. He also ghostwrote Swanson's 1981 autobiography Swanson on Swanson, which became a commercial success. The same year, she designed a stamp cachet for the  United Nations Decade for Women, which was her last creative project.

She was a pupil of the yoga guru Indra Devi and was photographed performing a series of yoga poses, reportedly looking much younger than her age, for Devi to use in her book Forever Young, Forever Healthy; but the publisher Prentice-Hall decided to use the photographs for Swanson's book, not Devi's. In return, Swanson, who normally never did publicity events, helped to launch Devi's book at the Waldorf-Astoria in 1953.

As a Republican she supported the 1940 and 1944 campaigns for president of Wendell Willkie and the 1964 presidential campaign of Barry Goldwater. In 1980, she chaired the New York chapter of Seniors for Reagan-Bush.

In 1964, Swanson spoke at a "Project Prayer" rally attended by 2,500 at the Shrine Auditorium in Los Angeles. The gathering, which was hosted by Anthony Eisley, a star of ABC's Hawaiian Eye series, sought to flood the United States Congress with letters in support of mandatory school prayer, following two decisions in 1962 and 1963 of the United States Supreme Court, which struck down mandatory prayer as conflicting with the Establishment Clause of the First Amendment to the United States Constitution. Joining Swanson and Eisley at the Project Prayer rally were Walter Brennan, Lloyd Nolan, Rhonda Fleming, Pat Boone, and Dale Evans. Swanson declared "Under God we became the freest, strongest, wealthiest nation on earth. Should we change that?"

Marriages and relationships

Wallace Beery
Wallace Beery and Swanson married on her 17th birthday on March 27, 1916, but by her wedding night she felt she had made a mistake and saw no way out of it.  She did not like his home or his family and was repulsed by him as a lover. After becoming pregnant, she saw her husband with other women and learned he had been fired from Keystone. Taking medication given to her by Beery, purported to be for morning sickness, she miscarried the fetus and was taken unconscious to the hospital. Soon afterwards, she filed for divorce, which was finalized on December 12, 1918. Under California law in that era, there was a one-year waiting period after a divorce was granted before it became finalized and either of the parties could remarry.

Herbert K. Somborn
She married Herbert K. Somborn on December 20, 1919. He was at that time president of Equity Pictures Corporation and later the owner of the Brown Derby restaurant. Their daughter, Gloria Swanson Somborn, was born October 7, 1920. In 1923, she adopted 1-year-old Sonny Smith, whom she renamed Joseph Patrick Swanson after her father. During their divorce proceedings, Somborn accused her of adultery with 13 men, including Cecil B. DeMille, and Marshall Neilan.  The public sensationalism led to Swanson having a "morals clause" added to her studio contract. Somborn was granted a divorce in Los Angeles, on September 19, 1923.

Henri de la Falaise

During the production of Madame Sans-Gêne, Swanson met her third husband, Henri, Marquis de la Falaise (commonly known as Henri de la Falaise), who had been hired to be her translator during the film's production. Though Henri was a Marquis and related to the famous Hennessy cognac family, he had no personal wealth. She had conceived a child with him before her divorce from Somborn was final, a situation that would have led to a public scandal and possible end of her film career. She had an abortion, which she later regretted. They married on January 28, 1925, after the Somborn divorce was finalized. Following a four-month recuperation from her abortion, they returned to the United States as European nobility. Swanson now held the title of Marquise. She received a huge welcome home with parades in both New York and Los Angeles. He became a film executive representing Pathé (USA) in France. This marriage ended in divorce in 1930.

In spite of the divorce, they remained close and Falaise became a partner in her World War II efforts to aid potential scientist refugees fleeing from behind Nazi lines. Swanson described herself as a "mental vampire", someone with a searching curiosity about how things worked, and who pursued the possibilities of turning those ideas into reality. In 1939, she created Multiprises, an inventions and patents company; Henri de la Falaise provided a transitional Paris office for the scientists and gave written documentation to authorities guaranteeing jobs for them.  Viennese electronics engineer Richard Kobler, chemist Leopold Karniol, metallurgist Anton Kratky, and acoustical engineer Leopold Neumann, were brought to New York and headquartered in Rockefeller Center. The group nicknamed her "Big Chief".

Joseph P. Kennedy
While still married to Henri, Swanson had a lengthy affair with the married Joseph P. Kennedy, father of future President John F. Kennedy. He became her business partner and their relationship was an open secret in Hollywood. He took over all of her personal and business affairs and was supposed to make her millions. Kennedy left her after the disastrous Queen Kelly.

Michael Farmer
After the marriage to Henri and her affair with Kennedy was over, Swanson became acquainted with Michael Farmer, the man who would become her fourth husband.  They met by chance in Paris when Swanson was being fitted by Coco Chanel for her 1931 film Tonight or Never. Farmer was a man of independent financial means who seemed not to have been employed. Rumors were that he was a gigolo. Swanson began spending time with him,  during which she discovered a breast lump and also became pregnant, but was not yet divorced from Henri.  She was not interested in marrying Farmer, but he did not want to break off the relationship. When Farmer found out she was pregnant, he threatened to go public with the news unless she agreed to marry him, something she did not want to do. Her friends, some of whom openly disliked him, thought she was making a mistake.  They married on August 16, 1931, and separated 2 years later.

Because of the possibility that Swanson's divorce from La Falaise had not been finalized at the time of the wedding, she was forced to remarry Farmer the following November, by which time she was four months pregnant with Michelle Bridget Farmer, who was born on April 5, 1932.

Herbert Marshall
Swanson and Farmer divorced in 1934 after she became involved with married British actor Herbert Marshall. The media reported widely on her affair with Marshall. After almost three years with the actor, Swanson left him once she became convinced he would never divorce his wife Edna Best, for her. In an early manuscript of her autobiography written in her own hand decades later, Swanson recalled "I was never so convincingly and thoroughly loved as I was by Herbert Marshall."

William M. Davey

Davey was a wealthy investment broker whom Swanson met in October 1944 while she was appearing in A Goose for the Gander. They married January 29, 1945. Swanson had initially thought she was going to be able to retire from acting, but the marriage was troubled by Davey's alcoholism from the start.  Erratic behavior and acrimonious recriminations followed. Swanson and her daughter Michelle Farmer visited an Alcoholics Anonymous meeting and gathered AA pamphlets, which they placed around the apartment. Davey moved out. In the subsequent legal separation proceedings, the judge ordered him to pay Swanson alimony.  In an effort to avoid the payments, Davey unsuccessfully filed for divorce on the grounds of mental cruelty. He died within a year, not having paid anything to Swanson, and left the bulk of his estate to the Damon Runyon Cancer Memorial Fund.

William Dufty
Swanson's final marriage occurred in 1976 and lasted until her death. Her sixth husband William Dufty was a writer who worked for many years at the New York Post, where he was assistant to the editor from 1951 to 1960. He was the co-author (ghostwriter) of Billie Holiday's autobiography Lady Sings the Blues, the author of Sugar Blues, a 1975 best-selling health book still in print, and the author of the English version of Georges Ohsawa's You Are All Sanpaku. They met in the mid-1960s and moved in together. Swanson shared her husband's enthusiasm for macrobiotic diets, and they traveled widely together to speak about nutrition. Swanson and her husband first got to know John Lennon and Yoko Ono because they were fans of Dufty's work. Swanson testified on Lennon's behalf at his immigration hearing in New York City, which led to his becoming a permanent resident. Besides her Fifth Avenue apartment, she and Dufty spent time at their homes in Beverly Hills, California; Colares, Portugal; Croton-on-Hudson, New York; and Palm Springs, California. After Swanson's death, Dufty returned to his former home in Birmingham, Michigan. He died of cancer in 2002.

Death 
Swanson died of a heart ailment at the New York Hospital on April 4, 1983. She had just returned from her home in the Portuguese Riviera. She was cremated and her ashes interred at the Episcopal Church of the Heavenly Rest on Fifth Avenue in New York City, attended by only a small circle of family. The church was the same one where the funeral of Chester A. Arthur had taken place.

After Swanson's death, there was a series of auctions from August to September 1983 at William Doyle Galleries in New York.  Collectors bought her furniture and decorations, jewelry, clothing, and memorabilia from her personal life and career.

Honors and legacy 
In 1960, Gloria Swanson was honored with two stars on the Hollywood Walk of Fame: one for motion pictures at 6750 Hollywood Boulevard, and another for television at 6301 Hollywood Boulevard. In 1955 and 1957, Swanson was awarded The George Eastman Award, given by George Eastman House for distinguished contribution to the art of film, and in 1966, the museum honored her with a career film retrospective, titled A Tribute to Gloria Swanson, which screened several of her movies. In 1974, Swanson was one of the honorees of the first Telluride Film Festival. A parking lot by Sims Park in downtown New Port Richey, Florida, is named after the star, who is said to have owned property along the Cotee River.

In 1982, a year before her death, Swanson sold her archives of over 600 boxes for an undisclosed sum, including photographs, artwork, copies of films and private papers, including correspondence, contracts, and financial dealings, to the Harry Ransom Center at the University of Texas at Austin. An undisclosed amount of memorabilia was also gifted to the HRC Center between 1983 and 1988.

In 1989, the Library of Congress chose Sunset Boulevard, along with 24 other films, "to be preserved in the permanent collection of the National Film Registry of the Library of Congress as culturally, historically, and aesthetically important".

Portrayals 
Swanson has been played both on television and in film by the following actresses:

 1971: Carol Burnett on The Carol Burnett Show
1984: Diane Venora in The Cotton Club
 1990: Madolyn Smith in The Kennedys of Massachusetts
 1991: Ann Turkel in White Hot: The Mysterious Murder of Thelma Todd
 2008: Kristen Wiig in Saturday Night Live
 2013: Debi Mazar in Return to Babylon

Stage

Note: The list below is limited to New York Broadway theatrical productions.

Filmography

Shorts

Features

Television

Awards and nominations

See also 
 List of actors with Academy Award nominations

Notes

Bibliography

Further reading

External links

General
 
 
 
 Gloria Swanson  at the Women Film Pioneers Project
 Glorious Gloria Swanson – Tribute site
 Gloria Swanson's papers  at the Harry Ransom Center at the University of Texas at Austin
 Gloria Swanson photographs and bibliography

Interviews
 Gloria Swanson, video of The Mike Wallace Interview, April 28, 1957
 , August 3, 1970

1899 births
1983 deaths
20th-century American actresses
Actresses from Chicago
American film actresses
American silent film actresses
American radio actresses
American stage actresses
American television actresses
Best Drama Actress Golden Globe (film) winners
Film producers from New York (state)
American health activists
American Lutherans
20th-century American memoirists
American people of French descent
American people of German descent
American people of Polish descent
American people of Swedish descent
Paramount Pictures contract players
People from Croton-on-Hudson, New York
California Republicans
New York (state) Republicans
Illinois Republicans
Activists from California
Women film pioneers
American women film producers
Film producers from Illinois
American women memoirists
20th-century Lutherans